is a railway station on the Hohi Main Line, operated by JR Kyushu in Chūō-ku, Kumamoto, Japan.

Lines

Layout 
The station consists of a side platform serving a single elevated track. The station building is a modern elevated structure built in 2011, incorporating a staffed ticket window, automatic ticket vending machines, SUGOCA charge machines and readers, and an enclosed waiting room. The station building is accessed from street level by means of a flight of steps or an elevator. Two flights of steps also lead up to the station from the platforms of the nearby Shin-Suizenji ekimae tram stop operated by the Kumamoto City Transportation Bureau. Parking for bicycles is available underneath the elevater track.

Management of the station has been outsourced to the JR Kyushu Tetsudou Eigyou Co., a wholly owned subsidiary of JR Kyushu specialising in station services. It staffs the ticket booth which is equipped with a  Midori no Madoguchi facility.

Adjacent stations

History
JR Kyushu opened the station on 13 March 1988 as an addition station on the existing track of the Hōhi Main Line.

In 2007 the Kumamoto City authorities initiated work to improve traffic flow around the station. The existing station building at street level was rebuilt as an elevated building on stilts. The Shin-Suizenji-Ekimae tramstop, 150 metres away, was moved 100 metres nearer. Two sheltered flights of step were constructed to connect the tramstop platforms to the railway station building. The new station building and tram stop opened in April 2011.

Passenger statistics
In fiscal 2016, the station was used by an average of 4,276 passengers daily (boarding passengers only), and it ranked 49th among the busiest stations of JR Kyushu.

Environs
Kumamoto City Transportation Bureau: Shin-Suizenji-Ekimae Station, A and B-lines

See also
List of railway stations in Japan

References

External links
Shin-Suizenji (JR Kyushu)

Railway stations in Kumamoto Prefecture
Railway stations in Japan opened in 1988